is a former Japanese football player.

Playing career
Kushibiki was born in Osaka Prefecture on June 10, 1967. After graduating from Osaka University of Commerce, he joined Toshiba in 1990. In 1991, he moved to Otsuka Pharmaceutical. In 1993, he became a regular goalkeeper. In 1996, he moved to newly was promoted to J1 League club, Kyoto Purple Sanga. However he could not play many matches behind former Japan national team goalkeepers Shinichi Morishita and Shigetatsu Matsunaga. In 1999, he moved to Avispa Fukuoka. However he could not play at all in the match behind former Japan national team goalkeeper Nobuyuki Kojima. He retired end of 1999 season.

Club statistics

References

External links

kyotosangadc

1967 births
Living people
Osaka University of Commerce alumni
Association football people from Osaka Prefecture
Japanese footballers
Japan Soccer League players
J1 League players
Japan Football League (1992–1998) players
Hokkaido Consadole Sapporo players
Tokushima Vortis players
Kyoto Sanga FC players
Avispa Fukuoka players
Association football goalkeepers